Distressed lending typically provides credit facilities to borrowers with good cash generation capacity but short-term liquidity issues.

Liquidity lending versus collateral lending 
Distressed loans typically take the form of bridge or Mezzanine capital or similar hybrid structures and often place the distressed lender in a better position than existing common shareholders and lenders with respect to company's assets and cashflow.

Versus asset backed lending ("ABL")
Distressed lending can be contrasted with asset backed lending in that ABL typically provides collateralized credit facilities to borrowers with high financial leverage and marginal cash flows.  ABL's primary focus is on collateral and liquidity with leverage and cash flow being secondary considerations.  Borrowings under an asset-based facility are limited by the collateral base, which is measured by liquidation value of accounts receivable, inventory and fixed assets rather than by reference to direct, ongoing cash generation capacity.

See also
 Annual percentage rate (a.k.a. Effective annual rate)
 Bank, Fractional-reserve banking, Building society
 Credit risk
 Debt, Consumer debt, Debt consolidation, Government debt
 Default (finance)
 Finance, Personal finance, Settlement (finance)
 High-yield debt
 Interest-only loan, Negative amortization, PIK loan
 Loan guarantee
 Loan sale
 Payday loan
 Private equity
 Refund anticipation loan
 Stafford loan
 Student loan
 Student loan default
 Syndicated loan
 Title loan

References

Securities (finance)